Football at the 2018 Mediterranean Games took place between 22 June and 30 June at the Estadi Municipal de Reus, Estadi Municipal de La Pobla de Mafumet and Estadi Municipal de Calafell. Associations affiliated with FIFA were invited to send their men's U-18, U-19 and U-21 national teams. There was no women's tournament on this occasion.

Participating nations
Nine nations have applied to compete in men's tournament, one more than at the previous games. None of the Asian nations opted to compete.

Men

Squads

Venues
3 stadiums were allocated to host the matches.

Group stage
All times are local (UTC+2).

Group A

Group B

Group C

Ranking of second-placed teams

Classification stage
7th and 5th place brackets

Seventh place match

Fifth place match

Knockout stage

Semifinals

Bronze medal match

Gold medal match

Final standings

Goalscorers
7 goals

 Abel Ruiz

5 goals

 Davide Merola

4 goals

 Nicola Rauti

2 goals

 Idir Boutrif
 Armin Imamović
 Dimitrios Emmanouilidis
 Sergio Gómez Martín

1 goal

 Adem Zorgane
 Ajdin Hasić
 Bastian Badu
 Mamadou Gassama
 Yaya Soumaré
 Alexandros Gkargkalatzidis
 Alexandros Voilis
 Lorenzo Gavioli
 Hans Nicolussi Caviglia
 Manolo Portanova
 Emanuel Vignato
 Jihad Shaldun
 Soulaiman Drouich
 Aymane Mourid
 Azzeddine Ounahi
 Achraf Rharib
 Adil Tahif
 Nacho Díaz
 Oihan Sancet
 Sefa Akgün
 Behlül Aydin
 Ozan Kabak

Own goal

 Eldar Šehić (against Turkey)

References

External links
2018 Mediterranean Games – Football

 
Sports at the 2018 Mediterranean Games
2018
Mediterranean Games
2018
2018 in youth association football